Jade Jordan (born 1988) is an Irish actor and writer. She has appeared in film in Rosie (2018), and You Are Not My Mother (2021), and on television in Doctors (2018), The Virtues (2019), Kin (2021), Redemption (2022), and The Catch in 2023.

As an author, she wrote her autobiography Nanny, Ma and Me. and her first feature The Colour Between in 2021.

Early life
Jordan was born in Dublin and grew up in the Fingal suburb of Blanchardstown with her sister Pariss. Jordan attended secondary school at Coolmine Community School. She then did a course in theatre studies at Coláiste Dhúlaigh College of Further Education. In 2009, Jordan moved to London for drama school, graduating in 2013. She later trained at Bow Street Academy.

Career
In 2021, Jordan produced and wrote her first feature, The Colour Between. It was funded by Screen Ireland. She has performed with the Abbey Theatre and the Druid Theatre Company.

Jordan's 2021 autobiography Nanny, Ma and Me describes her experiences as a Black Irish woman and tells the stories of her grandmother, Kathleen, and her mother, Dominique. Kathleen, born in 1932, moved from Ireland to London in the 1950s to studying nursing. In 1963, she married Larry, a Jamaican man who moved to England as part of the Windrush generation. The couple had three children, including Dominique, and lived in Walthamstow. The family returned to Dublin in 1978, first living in a tenement building on Seán McDermott Street before moving to Blanchardstown in the 1980s.

In 2023, she appeared in the Channel 5 series The Catch.

Filmography

Film

Television

Music videos

Stage

Awards and nominations

Notes

References

External links 
 

Living people
1988 births
21st-century Irish actresses
Actresses from County Dublin
Black Irish people
Irish people of Jamaican descent
Irish film actresses
Irish television actresses